Tatiana Egorova (10 March 1970 – 29 July 2012) was a Russian footballer and manager. She played for CSK VVS Samara and Rossiyanka in the Russian Championship, and Turbine Potsdam in the German Bundesliga, and she was a member of the Russian national team, with whom she played the 1999 and 2003 World Cups.

She served as Rossiyanka's manager in 2010 and 2011, winning Rossiyanka's third double. Despite qualifying Rossiyanka for the 2012 Champions League quarter-finals she was sacked in January 2012.

Egorova died in Moscow on 29 July 2012 at the age of 42. The cause of her death was not disclosed by the media.

Titles
as a player:
 6 Russian Leagues (1993, 1994, 1996, 2001, 2005, 2006)
 3 Russian Cups (1994, 2005, 2006)
as a coach:
 1 Russian League (2010)
 1 Russian Cup (2010)

References

1970 births
2012 deaths
Russian women's footballers
Russian football managers
Expatriate women's footballers in Germany
Russian expatriate sportspeople in Germany
Russia women's international footballers
2003 FIFA Women's World Cup players
CSK VVS Samara (women's football club) players
FC Energy Voronezh players
1. FFC Turbine Potsdam players
Women's association football midfielders
1999 FIFA Women's World Cup players
WFC Rossiyanka players
Russian Women's Football Championship players